Riches and Stitches is a Hong Kong period drama produced by TVB starring Moses Chan, Kwong Wah, Anne Heung, Gigi Lai, and Melissa Ng. It was filmed in 2003, and then released overseas in December 2003.  Then it was aired on TVB Pay Vision's TVB Drama channel from 27 June to 5 August 2005. However, it has yet to be aired on TVB Jade.

Plot
Siu Chun Hang (Moses Chan) has had a special affection for Cheongsam. He makes his first cheongsam for his dream girl Po Chui Lung (Anne Heung), formerly a princess of the Qing Dynasty. He makes alterations to Lung's cheongsam, resulting in a design that is simple but elegant. Since then, he has become well known for his skills as a tailor and a designer.  But life is full of ups and downs. Who would have guessed that his success is just the beginning of his downfall?

Lung works for triad member Wing Ho Tung (Kwong Wa), owner of a nightclub. Lung suggests Hang designs clothes for Lang Heung Ling (Melissa Ng), a top dancer from Tung's nightclub, so that he can further develop his career. Though famous for his cheongsam, things do not really go well for Hang. And because of what is brother Cheung (Michael Tong) has done, Hang gets into serious trouble.

There seems to be no hope for Hang. But then there comes an angel － Hoi Tong (Gigi Lai), a singer and Cheung's ex-girlfriend, sticks by him and does her best to help him through his darkest moments. Meanwhile, Lung and Tung also make a great effort to him build up his confidence......

Cast

The Siu family

The Po family

Fung Mo Stage (鳳舞臺)

Fuk On Tong Gang (幫會福安堂)

Other cast

External links
 TVBI Official Website
 TVBS Official Website

TVB dramas
Hong Kong television shows
2003 Hong Kong television series debuts
2004 Hong Kong television series endings
2005 Hong Kong television series debuts
2005 Hong Kong television series endings
2013 Hong Kong television series debuts
2013 Hong Kong television series endings
Period television series
Triad (organized crime)